Destination Moon (a.k.a. Operation Moon) is a 1950 American Technicolor science fiction film, independently produced by George Pal and directed by Irving Pichel, that stars John Archer, Warner Anderson, Tom Powers, and Dick Wesson. The film was distributed in the United States and the United Kingdom by Eagle-Lion Classics.

Destination Moon was the first major U.S. science fiction film to deal with the practical scientific and engineering challenges of space travel and to speculate on what a crewed expedition to the Moon would look like. Noted science fiction author Robert A. Heinlein contributed to the screenplay.

The film's premise is that private industry will mobilize, finance, and manufacture the first spacecraft to the Moon, and that the U.S. government will be forced to purchase or lease the technology to remain the dominant power in space. Different industrialists cooperate to support the private venture.

In the final scene, as the crew approaches the Earth, the traditional "The End" title card heralds the dawn of the coming Space Age: "This is THE END...of the Beginning".

Plot
When their latest rocket test fails and government funding collapses, rocket scientist Dr. Charles Cargraves (Warner Anderson) and space enthusiast General Thayer (Tom Powers) enlist the aid of aircraft magnate Jim Barnes (John Archer). With the necessary millions raised privately from a group of patriotic U.S. industrialists, Cargraves, Thayer, and Barnes build an advanced single-stage-to-orbit atomic powered spaceship, named Luna, at their desert manufacturing and launch facility.

The project is soon threatened by a ginned-up public uproar over "radiation safety" but the three circumvent legal efforts to stop their expedition by launching the world's first Moon mission ahead of schedule. As a result, they must quickly substitute Joe Sweeney (Dick Wesson) as their expedition's radar and radio operator, a replacement for Brown (Ted Warde), now in the hospital with appendicitis.

En route to the Moon they are forced to spacewalk outside. They stay firmly attached to Luna with their magnetic boots so they can easily walk up to and free the frozen piloting radar antenna that the inexperienced Sweeney innocently greased before launch. In the process, Cargraves becomes untethered in free fall and is lost overboard. He is retrieved by Barnes, who cleverly uses a large oxygen cylinder with nozzle, retrieved by General Thayer, as an improvised propulsion unit to return them to Luna.

After achieving lunar orbit, the crew begins the complex landing procedure, but expedition leader Barnes uses too much fuel during the descent. Safely on the Moon, they explore the lunar surface and describe by radio their view of the Earth, as contrasted against the star-filled lunar night sky. Using forced perspective, Barnes photographs Sweeney pretending to "hold up" the Earth like a modern Atlas. Events take a serious turn for the crew, however, when they realize that with their limited remaining fuel they must lighten Luna in order to achieve lunar escape velocity.

No matter how much non-critical equipment they strip and discard on the lunar surface, the hard numbers radioed from Earth continue to point to one conclusion: One of them will have to remain on the Moon if the others are to safely return to Earth. With time running out for their return launch window, the crew continues to engineer their way home. They finally jettison the ship's radio, losing contact with Earth. In addition, a spent oxygen cylinder is used as a tethered, suspended weight to pull their sole remaining space suit outside through the open airlock, which is then remotely closed and resealed. With the critical take-off weight finally achieved, and with all her crew safely aboard, Luna blasts off from the Moon for home.

Cast
 John Archer as Jim Barnes
 Warner Anderson as Dr. Charles Cargraves
 Tom Powers as General Thayer
 Dick Wesson as Joe Sweeney
 Erin O'Brien-Moore as Emily Cargraves
 Franklyn Farnum as Factory Worker (uncredited)
 Everett Glass as Mr. La Porte (uncredited)
 Knox Manning as Knox Manning (uncredited)
 Kenner G. Kemp as Businessman at meeting (uncredited)
 Mike Miller as Man (uncredited)
 Irving Pichel as Narrator of Woody Woodpecker Cartoon (uncredited)
 Cosmo Sardo as Businessman at Meeting (uncredited)
 Bert Stevens as Businessman at meeting (uncredited)
 Ted Warde as Brown (uncredited)
 Grace Stafford as Woody Woodpecker (voice) (uncredited)

Production
Before Destination Moon, there were very few serious science fiction films: 1929's Frau im Mond (English Woman in the Moon), 1931's Frankenstein, and 1936's Things to Come are antecedents (though containing fantasy elements). However, the more juvenile-oriented Flash Gordon and Buck Rogers stories of the 1930s syndicated  science fiction newspaper comic strips that were both adapted into radio serials and Universal Pictures film serials.

George Pal was a Hungarian who made commercials that played as short subjects with feature films in Europe. He later advanced into animated cartoon-like short features that were made using carefully hand-manipulated tiny sculptures instead of drawings; these shorts were called “Puppetoons”, and they became popular in Europe. Pal was in the U.S. when Hitler invaded Poland. He was offered a contract to produce his Puppetoons for Paramount Pictures, some of which were later nominated for Academy Awards.

Development
By 1949, Pal wanted to get into feature film production. He convinced the independent Eagle-Lion Films to co-finance his own two-picture deal, with him putting up half of the money. Part of the finance came from Peter Rathvorn and Floyd Odlum, who used to run RKO. The first of the two films, The Great Rupert, about a Puppetoon-like dancing squirrel, starring popular comic Jimmy Durante, flopped at the box office. But his second feature, Destination Moon, was a major hit.

Eagle-Lion's publicity department saw the promotional possibilities for a film about a rocket expedition to the Moon. They promoted the film heavily in both general family magazines and in many science fiction digest magazines, emphasizing its Technicolor visuals and expert consultants. Destination Moon was constantly in the limelight of the era's popular press, including the high-profile Life magazine; by the time the film was shown in theaters, its success seemed a foregone conclusion.

Pal commissioned an initial screenplay from screenwriters James O'Hanlon and Rip Van Ronkel, but science fiction writer Robert A. Heinlein contributed significantly to Destination Moon'''s final screenplay, and also served as the film's technical adviser. Certain story elements from Heinlein's 1947 juvenile novel Rocket Ship Galileo were adapted for use in the film, and in September, 1950, he published a tie-in novella, "Destination Moon", based on the screenplay. The film's storyline also resembles portions of Heinlein's novel The Man Who Sold the Moon, which he wrote in 1949 but did not publish until 1951, a year after the Pal film opened.

Matte paintings by BonestellDestination Moon uses matte paintings by noted astronomical artist Chesley Bonestell.  These were used for the departure of the Luna from Earth; its approach to the Moon; the spaceship's landing on the lunar surface; and a panorama of the lunar landscape. An oft-noted criticism of the film is the fact that the lunar surface is crisscrossed with gaping cracks. Mudcracks would imply that the surface was once mud, which requires water, and the Moon does not have water. Bonestell, who painted the large backdrop that mimicked lunar crags and mountains, was unhappy with the cracks, which were designed by art director Ernst Fegté. “That was a mistake”, he insisted to Gail Morgan Hickman, author of The Films of George Pal. But Pal explained to Hickman, “Chesley was right, of course ... but we were shooting on a small sound stage because of our limited budget. We had to make the set look bigger. Chesley designed a beautiful backdrop, but it needed something to give it depth. That’s why we made the cracks. The cracks in the foreground were big and those in the distance were small, so it gave a real feeling of perspective. For some scenes we even used midgets in small spacesuits to add to the feeling of depth”.

Director
Irving Pichel began his Hollywood career as an actor during the 1920s and early 1930s, in such films as Dracula's Daughter and The Story of Temple Drake. He began directing in 1932; Destination Moon was his 30th film. Pichel was blacklisted after he was subpoenaed by the House Un-American Activities Committee in 1947, despite having never been called to testify. He directed five more films after Destination Moon before his death in 1954.

Woody Woodpecker
George Pal and Walter Lantz, who created the cartoon character Woody Woodpecker, had been close friends ever since Pal left Europe and arrived in Hollywood. Out of friendship and for good luck, Pal always tried to include Woody in all his films. (On the commentary track of the Special Collector's DVD Edition of George Pal's science fiction film The War of the Worlds (1953), actors Ann Robinson and Gene Barry point out that Woody can be seen in a tree top, center screen, near the beginning of their film.)

Pal incorporates Woody (voiced by Grace Stafford) in a cartoon shown within the film that explains, in layman's terms to a 1950 movie  theater audience, the scientific principles behind space travel and how a trip to the Moon might be accomplished. The cartoon is shown to a gathering of U.S. industrialists who, it is hoped, will patriotically finance such a daring venture before an unnamed, non-western power can do so successfully.

Production credits
 Director - Irving Pichel
 Producer - George Pal 
 Writing - Rip Van Ronkel, Robert A. Heinlein, and James O'Hanlon (screenplay), Robert A. Heinlein (underlying novel)
 Cinematography - Lionel Lindon (photography)
 Art direction - Ernst Fegté (production designer), George Sawley (set decoration)
 Film editor - Duke Goldstone
 Production supervisor - Martin Eisenberg
 Cartoon  sequences - Walter Lantz
 Technicolor color consultant - Robert Brower 
 Assistant director - Harold Godsoe
 Special effects - Lee Zavitz
 Makeup artist - Webster Phillips
 Sound - William Lynch 
 Music - Leith Stevens (music), David Torbett (orchestration)
 Technical - Chesley Bonestell (technical advisor of astronomical art), Robert A. Heinlein (technical advisor), John S. Abbott (technical supervisor)

Soundtrack
The soundtrack music, written by composer Leith Stevens, is noteworthy for its atmospheric themes and musical motifs, all of which add subtle but important detail and emotion to the various dramatic moments in the film. According to George Pal biographer Gail Morgan Hickman, "Stevens ... consulted with numerous scientists, including Wernher von Braun, to get an idea of what space was like in order to create it musically."The 1960 Destination Moon Omega Disk stereo soundtrack album (#OSL-3) liner notes include background by music-commentator Cy Schneider: "When Leith Stevens was called upon back in 1950 to compose a score for George Pal's motion picture Destination Moon, he had a peculiar creative problem on his hands. The picture dealt with man making a rocket to fly him to the moon and this science fiction fantasy itself was created to play upon inexperienced emotions by showing images never before seen. At that time, information on space, the moon's surface, rocket launchings and all the other scientific lingo that has become popular knowledge today, was considerably harder to come by. It took Stevens over three months to steep himself in enough scientific lore to prepare himself to write the first notes. He consulted with many scientists... In these conferences and by studying countless artist’s sketches of the moon’s surface, Stevens was able to discover what the space world was like. The result was a startling, particularly dramatic score which became immediately popular. The music evoked new feelings, new mental pictures ... it investigated a musical world never before probed or propounded so sharply." (Schneider, Cy. Destination Moon soundtrack liner notes, Omega Disk label stereophonic 33 1/3 LP [#OSL-3], 1960. ASIN: B002MK54BQ.) The Stevens Destination Moon film score had its first U.S. release in 1950 on a 10-inch 33 rpm Monaural LP by Columbia Records (#CL 6151):

Later in the 1950s, the score was re-released on a 12-inch high-fidelity mono LP by Omega Disk (#1003). Omega Disk re-released it in 1960 as a stereophonic 33 1/3 LP (#OLS-3). In 1980, the score was re-released on stereo LP by Varèse Sarabande (#STV 81130) and again in 1995 on stereo LP by Citadel Records (#STC 77101). An expanded and complete 56.32 minute version of Steven's original film score, limited to 1,000 copies, was released on CD in 2012 by Monstrous Movie Music (#MMM-1967); also on the CD is Clarence Wheeler's incidental music used for the film's Woody Woodpecker cartoon. An illustrated 20-page booklet of liner notes is also included.

Reception

Release
Despite a budget of approximately $500,000 and a large national print media and radio publicity campaign preceding its delayed release, Destination Moon ultimately became the "second" space adventure film of the post-World War II era. Piggybacking on the growing publicity and expectation surrounding the Pal film, Lippert Pictures quickly shot Rocketship X-M in 18 days on a $94,000 budget. The film, about the first spaceship to land on Mars, opened theatrically 25 days before the Pal feature. Nevertheless, despite the fact that Destination Moon was indeed the second space film of the era to be released to theaters, its two years of production, hefty budget, its use of Technicolor, its significant influence in the film industry, and the technical consultation by important scientists and engineers during production—the ultimate value of the picture, also its priority, transcends the mere physical fact that it was second in the marketplace. Certainly, Rocketship X-M itself would never have been made if the highly probable success of Destination Moon had not caught Robert Lippert's attention.

Critical reaction
The film has had numerous admirers and detractors over the years.

Contemporary reviews
Bosley Crowther in his review of Destination Moon for The New York Times, opined, "... we've got to say this for Mr. Pal and his film: they make a lunar expedition a most intriguing and picturesque event. Even the solemn preparations for this unique exploratory trip, though the lesser phase of the adventure, are profoundly impressive to observe".

Science writer, science fiction novelist, and early space enthusiast Arthur C. Clarke wrote: "[T]his [is a] remarkable exciting and often very beautiful film, the first Technicolor expedition into space. After years of comic strip treatment of interplanetary travel, Hollywood has at last made a serious and scientifically accurate film on the subject, with full cooperation of astronomers and rocket experts. The result is worthy of the enormous pains that have obviously been taken, and it is a tribute to the equally obvious enthusiasm of those responsible".

Later 20th century reviews
“Trivial in plot ... viewed today Destination Moon is less than impressive; the rocket journey is ploddingly consistent with the scientific standards of 1950... Destination Moon makes rather dull viewing nowadays”. —John Baxter in Science Fiction in the Cinema (1970) 

In his 1979 autobiography, science writer and science fiction novelist Isaac Asimov called the Pal film "the first intelligent science-fiction movie made".

"Today it seems dated and slow-moving with flat characters". —John Brosnan in The Science Fiction Encyclopedia (1979)

Peter Nicholls in The Encyclopedia of Science Fiction (1993) said, “Destination Moon is a film with considerable dignity and, in a quiet way, a genuine sense of wonder”.

“The Destination Moon script seems colorless and wooden”. —Phil Hardy in The Overlook Film Encyclopedia: Science Fiction (1994)

21st century reviews
“Destination Moon now seems tame”. —John Stanley in Creature Features: The Science Fiction, Fantasy and Horror Movie Guide (2000)

“The visual effects in Pal’s [Destination Moon] were art. They are aesthetically stunning ... they bear the imprint of gifted artists’ hands.... The Luna rocket of Destination Moon still [has] the capacity to astonish”. —Justin Humphreys in “A Cinema of Miracles: Remembering George Pal”, from the memorial program notes for the Academy of Motion Picture Arts and Sciences’ George Pal: Discovering the Fantastic: A Centennial Celebration, August 27, 2008

In 2010, author and film critic Leonard Maltin awarded the film two-and-a-half out of four stars, calling it "modestly mounted but still effective". He also praised Bonestell's lunar paintings as being visually striking.

“Destination Moon has aged badly ... [it] seems old hat and pedestrian to today’s viewers... But make no mistake about it, this picture, flaws and all, is a very important step in the evolution of the serious, special effects-laden science fiction motion picture that reached its peak with ... 2001: A Space Odyssey”. — Barry Atkinson in Atomic Age Cinema (2014)

Awards and honorsDestination Moon won the Academy Award for Best Special Effects in the name of the effects director, Lee Zavitz. The film was also nominated for the Art Direction Academy Award, by Ernst Fegté and George Sawley.

At the 1st Berlin International Film Festival it won the Bronze Berlin Bear Award, for "Thrillers and Adventure Films".

Retro Hugo Awards: A special 1951 Hugo Award for Best Dramatic Presentation was retroactively awarded to Destination Moon by the 59th World Science Fiction Convention (2001) exactly 50 years later for being one of the science fiction films eligible in calendar year 1950. (50 years, 75 years, or 100 years govern the time periods when a Retro Hugo can be awarded by a Worldcon for the years prior to 1953 when the Hugos were established and first awarded.)

Adaptations
 
Episode 12 of the Dimension X radio series was called Destination Moon and was based on Heinlein's final draft of the film's shooting script. During the broadcast on June 24, 1950, the program was interrupted by a news bulletin announcing that North Korea had declared war on South Korea, marking the beginning of the Korean War.

Robert A. Heinlein published a short story adaptation of his screenplay in the September 1950 issue of Short Stories magazine.

A highly condensed version of the Dimension X Destination Moon radio play was adapted by Charles Palmer and was released by Capitol Records for children, who had become familiar with their recordings through a Bozo the Clown-approved record series. The series featured 7-inch, 78-rpm recordings and full-color booklets which children could follow as they listened to the stories. The Destination Moon record was narrated by Tom Reddy, and Billy May composed the incidental and background music. The record's storyline took considerable liberties with the film's plot and characters, although the general shape of the film story remained.

In 1950, Fawcett Publications released a 10-cent Destination Moon film tie-in comic book. DC Comics also published a comic book preview on the Pal film; it was the cover feature of DC's brand new science fiction anthology comic book Strange Adventures # 1 (September 1950).

See also
 1950 in film
 List of science fiction films of the 1950s

References
Notes

Bibliography

 Adamson. Joe The Walter Lantz Story: With Woody Woodpecker and Friends. New York: G.P. Putnam's Sons, 1985. .
 Buhle, Paul and Dave Wagner. A Very Dangerous Citizen: Abraham Lincoln Polonsky and the Hollywood Left. Berkeley, California: University of California Press, 2002. .
 Heinlein, Robert A. "Shooting Destination Moon". Astounding Science Fiction. London: Atlas Pub. and Distributing Co., July 1950. ISSN 1059-2113.
 Hickman, Gail Morgan. The Films of George Pal. New York: A. S. Barnes and Company, 1977. . 
 Johnson, William. Focus on the Science Fiction Film (Illustrated ed.). Englewood Cliffs, New Jersey: Prentice-Hall, 1972. . 
 Kondo, Yoji. Requiem: New Collected Works by Robert A. Heinlein and Tributes to the Grand Master. New York: Tom Doherty Associates, 1992. .
 Koszarski, Richard. Hollywood Directors, 1941–1976. New York: Oxford University Press, 1977. .
 Lev, Peter. Transforming the Screen: 1950–1959. Berkeley, California: University of California Press, 2003. .
 McBride, Joseph. Searching For John Ford: A Life. New York: St. Martin's Press, 2003. .
 Miller, Thomas Kent. Mars in the Movies: A History. Jefferson, North Carolina: McFarland & Company, 2016. .
 Parish, James Robert and Michael R. Pitts. The Great Science Fiction Pictures. Metuchen, New Jersey: Scarecrow Press, 1977. . 
 Pym, John, ed. "Destination Moon." Time Out Film Guide. London: Time Out Guides Limited, 2004. .
 Schneider, Cy. Destination Moon soundtrack liner notes, Omega Disk label stereophonic 33 1/3 LP (#OSL-3), 1960. ASIN: B002MK54BQ.
 Strick, Philip. Science Fiction Movies'' (Illustrated ed.). London: Octopus Books 1976. . 
 .

External links
 
 
 
 
 
 Original soundtrack for Destination Moon

1950 films
1950s independent films
1950s science fiction films
American films with live action and animation
American science fiction adventure films
American space adventure films
Moon in film
Eagle-Lion Films films
Films about astronauts
Films adapted into comics
Films based on American novels
Films based on science fiction novels
Films based on works by Robert A. Heinlein
Films directed by Irving Pichel
Films produced by George Pal
Films scored by Leith Stevens
Films that won the Best Visual Effects Academy Award
Films with screenplays by Robert A. Heinlein
Hard science fiction films
1950s English-language films
1950s American films